Virender Thakran (born 1970) is a former Indian wrestler. He won a bronze medal in the World Wrestling Championship in 1992 at Cali. He won a silver medal in Commonwealth Championship in 1995 (Senior, 74 kg, Freestyle). He was a Gold Medallist in the South Asian Championship (SAF Games). He is very popular by nickname Dheeraj Pahalwan in the rural tournaments of wrestling.

Born
He was born at village Jharsa near Gurgaon. His father Bharat Singh Thakran was a farmer. His sister Smt. Pritam Rani Siwach was the captain of the Indian women's hockey team. He was fond of wrestling in his early childhood. He had started his practice in Nehru Stadium Gurgaon at the age of 10.

Career
The Haryana state is known as the birthplace of wrestlers in India. There are many wrestlers of Haryana who gave the proud to India in the field of wrestling. His father friend Mr. Hansram Pahalwan gave the suggestion to send him in Guru Hanuman Akhara Delhi because Mr. Hansram was also a pupil of Guru Hanuman in his early age. The Guru Hanuman is the most popular trainer of wrestlers. He had won Bronze medal in World Wrestling Championship in 1992 at Cali. He had won Silver medal in Commonwealth Championship in 1995 (Senior, 74 kg, Freestyle). He had secured 7th position in World Wrestling Championship in year 1992 (Junior, 74 kg, Freestyle). He also secured 4th position in Commonwealth Championship in the year 1993 (Senior, 74 kg, Freestyle).

Vegetarian
He is a vegetarian wrestler. He takes 3 litres of milk  and 25 grams almonds per day.

References

External links
 Indian grapplers up their performance By Kirti Patil
 NR bag wrestling trophy Tribune News Service
 
 world wrestling database

1970 births
Living people
Indian male sport wrestlers
People from Gurgaon district
Sport wrestlers from Haryana
South Asian Games gold medalists for India
South Asian Games medalists in wrestling
World Wrestling Championships medalists